Giacomo Vassanelli (born 5 May 1983 in Verona) is a freestyle swimmer from Italy, who won the gold medal in the men's 4×100 metres freestyle event at the 2004 European Championships. He represented his native country a couple of months later at the 2004 Summer Olympics in Athens, Greece.

References
 Profile

1983 births
Living people
Italian male freestyle swimmers
Swimmers at the 2004 Summer Olympics
Olympic swimmers of Italy
Sportspeople from Verona
European Aquatics Championships medalists in swimming